Alberto Etchebehere (1903–1965) was an Argentine cinematographer.

Selected filmography
 Streets of Buenos Aires (1934)
 The Life of Carlos Gardel (1939)
 My Country's Wings (1939)
 Educating Niní (1940)
 At the Sound of the Bugle (1941)
 The Song of the Suburbs (1941)
 Girls Orchestra (1941)
 The Third Kiss (1942)
 Carmen (1943)
 Candida, Woman of the Year (1943)
 Saint Candida (1945)
 Two Angels and a Sinner (1945)
 María Rosa (1946)
 Christmas with the Poor (1947)
 The Headless Woman (1947)
 Story of a Bad Woman (1948)
 God Reward You (1948)
 The Fan (1951)
 The Orchid (1951)
 This Is My Life (1952)
 The Beast Must Die (1952)
 The Count of Monte Cristo (1953)
 The Kidnapper  (1958)
 Thirst (1960)

References

Bibliography 
 Ann Davies & Phil Powrie. Carmen on Screen: An Annotated Filmography and Bibliography. Tamesis Books, 2006.

External links 
 

1903 births
1965 deaths
Argentine cinematographers
People from Buenos Aires